Arnold G. Kluge (born 1935) is professor emeritus of zoology and curator emeritus of amphibians and reptiles at the University of Michigan, Museum of Zoology. Kluge authored over 140 journal articles. He served as past president of the Willi Hennig Society and as editor-in-chief of its journal Cladistics. He served at the University of Michigan from 1965 until his retirement in 2003.

Amongst the new taxa published by Kluge is Crenadactylus, tiny Australian clawless geckos reclassified as a separate genus with co-author James R. Dixon in 1964.

Eponyms
Dr. Kluge is honored in the specific names of three species of lizards.
Cyrtodactylus klugei
Diplodactylus klugei
Lygodactylus klugei

References

Evolutionary biologists
Living people
University of Michigan faculty
1935 births
American herpetologists
Fulbright alumni